Filistin Ashabab ( "Palestine Of The Youth" ) is a Palestinian monthly magazine. Launched in 2007, Filistin Ashabab is a free cultural magazine giving the youth in Palestine and in the diaspora a field of expression and access to the culture. It is distributed in all Palestine.

Cultural initiatives
In 2009, the magazine extends to a weekly radio program Filistin Ashabab Radio on the local radio Raya FM.

References

External links
 Filistin Ashabab online magazine(PDF version)

Arabic-language magazines
Magazines established in 2007
Mass media in Ramallah
Monthly magazines